The Zhangyuan Tunnel is a tunnel in Yonghe Village, Zhongliao, Nantou County, Taiwan.

History
The single-cave tunnel was constructed during the Japanese rule of Taiwan where the government organized civil labors to dig the tunnel. In 1991, another cave was cut due to the road widening project.

See also
 Transportation in Taiwan

References

Buildings and structures in Nantou County
Road tunnels in Taiwan
Transportation in Nantou County